Kjetil Ruthford Pedersen (born 22 May 1973) is a retired Norwegian footballer and later manager. He has played for FK Vigør, Odd Grenland, Molde FK, Skeid, IF Elfsborg, LASK Linz, Esbjerg fB, Sogndal, IK Start and FK Mandalskameratene.

He is the son of Erik Ruthford Pedersen and brother of Steinar Pedersen. As a manager, Kjetil Ruthford Pedersen signed his nephew Emil Grønn Pedersen.

References

1973 births
Living people
Association football defenders
Norwegian footballers
Odds BK players
Molde FK players
Skeid Fotball players
IF Elfsborg players
LASK players
Esbjerg fB players
Sogndal Fotball players
IK Start players
Mandalskameratene players
Eliteserien players
Norwegian First Division players
Norwegian Second Division players
Allsvenskan players
Austrian Football Bundesliga players
Danish Superliga players
Expatriate footballers in Sweden
Expatriate footballers in Austria
Expatriate men's footballers in Denmark
Norwegian expatriate sportspeople in Sweden
Norwegian expatriate sportspeople in Austria
Norwegian expatriate sportspeople in Denmark
Norwegian expatriate footballers
Norwegian football managers